Frank Lankester Horsey  (22 January 1884 – 19 August 1956) was an English first-class cricketer and Royal Navy officer, serving as paymaster from 1905–39.

Horsey was born in Suffolk at Woodbridge in January 1884, son of F. J. Horsey, of the Inland Revenue Service. He was employed as a clerk in the Admiralty, with promotion to the rank of assistant paymaster coming in January 1905. Horsey made a single appearance in first-class cricket for the Royal Navy against the British Army cricket team at Lord's in 1914. Batting twice in the match, he was dismissed in the Royal Navy first-innings for 15 runs by William Parker, while in their second-innings he was dismissed for 8 runs by Francis Wilson. He took two wickets in the Army's second-innings, dismissing Charles Loyd and Harold Fawcus to finish with figures of 2 for 17 from ten overs. During the First World War, he was promoted to the rank of paymaster in November 1916 and in April 1917 he received the Distinguished Service Cross. He was made an OBE in the 1919 Birthday Honours, for valuable services to Rear-Admiral John Laurd. He was promoted to the rank of paymaster commander in November 1922. He was made a companion of the Order of the Bath in the 1931 Birthday Honours, with promotion to the rank of paymaster captain following in June 1933. Horsey retired from active service in January 1939 and died at Surrey in August 1956. He had married in 1917, Ada, daughter of E. H. Hearn. Their son, Dr Peter John Horsey, was of Downside House, Winchester, Hampshire; he married Rosemary Heaton-Ellis, of that gentry family of Wyddial Hall.

References

External links

1884 births
1956 deaths
People from Woodbridge, Suffolk
Royal Navy officers
English cricketers
Royal Navy cricketers
Royal Navy personnel of World War I
Members of the Order of the British Empire
Recipients of the Distinguished Service Cross (United Kingdom)
Companions of the Order of the Bath
Royal Navy logistics officers